A by-election was held in the New South Wales Legislative Assembly seat of Bega in on 12 February 2022. The by-election was triggered by the resignation of Liberal MP and frontbencher Andrew Constance, who resigned to unsuccessfully contest the federal seat of Gilmore at the 2022 Australian federal election.

The Bega by-election was held on the same day as by-elections for the districts of Monaro, Strathfield and Willoughby. The writs for election were issued on 21 January 2022. Nominations for candidates closed seven days later at noon on 27 January, with the ballot paper draw commencing in the morning of 28 January.

The NSW Electoral Commission pre-emptively sent postal ballots to all voters registered on the state electoral roll, under a regulation in a COVID amendment to the Electoral Act. Postal votes will be checked against in-person voting rolls to prevent double voting. The iVote online voting system was not used at these elections after the system failed during the NSW local government elections in December 2021.

Early results showed a swing of more than 13% towards Labor in the seat, suggesting it would be won by Michael Holland, the first time the seat of Bega would be held by the Australian Labor Party (ALP) since it was created in 1988. Holland claimed victory just before 9pm on election night. The Liberals' Fiona Kotvojs conceded nine days later on 21 February.

Candidates

Results

See also 

 Electoral results for the district of Bega
 List of New South Wales state by-elections

References

External links 

 New South Wales Electoral Commission: Bega State by-election

2022 elections in Australia
New South Wales state by-elections